The American LGBTQ+ Museum is a museum in development on the Upper West Side of Manhattan that will focus on New York City's LGBTQ history. It will be part of the campus of the New-York Historical Society, which is undergoing a 70,000 square foot expansion, and is slated to open in 2024. Under the leadership of Richard Burns, the museum's board chair, planning for a museum began in 2017. Ben Garcia was named the museum's first executive director in January 2022.

References

External links

Museums established in 2017
LGBT organizations in the United States